Golema Rečica is a village in the municipality of Tetovo, North Macedonia.

Demographics
According to the 2021 census, the village had a total of 3.604 inhabitants. Ethnic groups in the village include:

Albanians 3.422
Macedonians 1
Others 181

Sports
Local football club KF Reçica plays in the Macedonian Third League (West Division).

References

Villages in Tetovo Municipality
Albanian communities in North Macedonia